Stalag VIII-E (also known as Stalag 308) was a German World War II prisoner-of-war camp located next to the village of Neuhammer, Silesia (now Świętoszów, Poland). It was built on a large German Army training ground that is still in use today by the Polish Land Forces' 10th Armoured Cavalry Brigade. It housed Polish, French, and Soviet POWs.

Camp history
The camp was built in September 1939 to house several thousand prisoners from the invasion of Poland. After May 1940, they were joined by French prisoners taken during the Battle of France. In July 1941, the Poles and French were transferred to other camps, and were replaced with Soviet prisoners. In June 1942, Stalag VIII-E became a sub-camp (Zweiglager) of Stalag VIII-C and was renamed Stalag VIII-C/Z. During the war, a total of 57,545 Soviet POWs were held at the camp. The camp was liberated by the Red Army on 15 February 1945.

Post-war the camp was used by the Soviets to hold German Army and Polish Home Army prisoners before their transfer to Russia.

Memorial
In 1961, a monument was erected at the cemetery next to the site of Stalag VIII-C in remembrance of the thousands who died there. In 1971, the "Museum to the Martyrdom of Allied Prisoners of War" was established on the site of the camp to house mementos and records of both Stalag VIII-C and Stalag Luft III, as well as Stalag VIII-E.

See also 
 List of prisoner-of-war camps in Germany

References 
Notes

Bibliography
 
 
  History of the Sagan region

External links 
Account of a Russian POW in Germany (translated from Russian)

World War II prisoner of war camps in Germany
World War II sites in Poland